Vermont Garrison (October 29, 1915 – February 14, 1994) was a career officer in the United States Air Force, and a flying ace credited with 17.33 victories in aerial combat. He was one of only seven Americans to achieve ace status during World War II, then again against jet fighter opposition during the Korean War. In 1966, Garrison participated in his third war, as vice commander of the 8th Tactical Fighter Wing, and flew a full tour of bombing and fighter missions over North Vietnam.

During all three of his combat tours, Garrison was consistently older than his peers, becoming an ace in World War II at the age of 28, in Korea at the age of 37, and flying Rolling Thunder missions at the age of 51. For this and his renown as a gunnery expert, Garrison was known in the service as "The Gray Eagle".

U.S. Air Force historian and author Walter J. Boyne described Garrison as a "first-rate combat unit leader." Col. Robin Olds, commanding the 8th TFW in Thailand, said of his vice commander: "Of the many hundreds I've served with, Garry was one of the greatest—as pilot, as gentleman, as officer, and as friend."

Biography
Garrison was born on a farm near the tiny hamlet of Mt. Victory, in Pulaski County, Kentucky, a part of Appalachia. He was a younger half-brother to his father's first child and the oldest of five sons and three daughters (one of which died in infancy) born to Mayhue H. Garrison and his second wife, Shelta Harriet Sears Garrison. While he grew up farming and timbering to help his family subsist, he also completed a basic education despite the Great Depression. He graduated from Pulaski County Public Schools in 1933, then went on to two years at Eastern Kentucky State Teachers College, and earned a teaching certificate after a term at Sue Bennett Junior College in nearby London. He taught elementary school in one-room schools between 1936 and 1941.

Following his return from World War II, Garrison was married to Reatha Mae Cuthbert (1928–1959) of London, Kentucky, until her death in July 1959. Garrison remarried in August 1961 at Mountain Home, Idaho, to Marie E. Lee (1920–1997). The couple resided in Idaho after his 1973 retirement and raised three daughters and a son. Garrison died of a heart attack on February 14, 1994, in Mountain Home. He is buried at Arlington National Cemetery with his wives.

World War II

Royal Air Force
On March 17, 1941, Garrison enlisted in the United States Army and became an aviation cadet in Class 41-C at Muskogee, Oklahoma, but washed out of advanced flight training at Brooks Field, Texas, in October. Garrison promptly enlisted in the Royal Air Force at Dallas, Texas and completed flight training at El Centro, California. After obtaining his RAF wings, Pilot Officer Garrison was shipped to England, where after further training he was promoted to Flying Officer and made a gunnery instructor, posted to RAF Hawarden to train pilots flying North American Mustangs.

Army Air Forces

On July 13, 1943, Garrison transferred from the RAF to the United States Army Air Forces, receiving a commission as a first lieutenant. On September 26, after transition training in the P-47 Thunderbolt at RAF Atcham, he was assigned to the 4th Fighter Group, based at RAF Debden, as a member of the 336th Fighter Squadron. Garrison's first combat mission came on October 4, 1943. The 4th Fighter Group was assigned to support a task force of 3rd Bomb Division B-17s on its withdrawal after bombing Frankfurt am Main, Germany. It proceeded to the rendezvous-point at Eupen, Belgium, but could find no bombers, remained in the vicinity for 16 minutes, and then withdrew.

Garrison recorded his first combat victory returning from a bomber withdrawal support mission to Bremen on December 16, 1943. In exceptionally bad winter weather conditions, he shared credit for shooting down a Junkers Ju 88 fighter over the German-Dutch border with Don Gentile and Louis Norley.  A month later, on January 14, 1944, he downed two Focke-Wulf Fw 190s, although his claim report for the second kill credited half to Norley. A review of his gun camera film, however, resulted in the award to Garrison of both victories. By February 10 he had scored his fifth kill and made ace, followed by a sixth victory on February 25, during an escort mission supporting the Big Week bomber offensive.

The next day his squadron began conversion to the P-51B Mustang fighter. On March 3, 1944, the 4th Fighter Group flew a bomber support mission to Berlin for the first time, resulting in several large aerial engagements. Garrison was part of a flight of nine P-51s of the 4th engaging more than 60 Luftwaffe fighters attacking bombers at 24,000 feet near Wittenberg. Three of the flight, including Garrison, were shot down. Despite losing his aircraft's supercharger and having three of its four guns jam, Garrison shot down an Fw 190 and received a "probable" for downing a Messerschmitt Bf 110. Flying back to England at low level with two wingmen, one of whom had a damaged engine and could not maintain altitude, Garrison was shot down by antiaircraft fire near Boulogne-sur-Mer and bailed out. Captured almost immediately, he was subjected to two weeks of interrogations, then shipped to Stalag Luft I, the German Prisoner-of-war camp near Barth, Germany.

U.S. Air Force

Post-war service
Liberated on May 1, 1945, by Soviet troops, Garrison elected to rejoin his squadron rather than return to the United States. He remained with the 336th FS until it was inactivated in September 1945, then transferred to the 406th Fighter Group on occupation duty in Germany. In 1946 he transferred to the 56th Fighter Group at Selfridge Field, Michigan, where he again flew P-47s. Garrison rejoined the 4th Fighter Group (now a component of the 4th Fighter Wing) at Andrews Air Force Base, Maryland, in April 1947, was promoted to captain, and became part of the U. S. Air Force when it became an independent service on September 18.

Garrison organized and led a jet aerial demonstration team for the 4th FW, flying P-80 Shooting Stars, and participated in the first official delivery of air mail by jet to celebrate the 30th anniversary of air mail on May 15, 1948. Using the same route as in 1918, Garrison delivered a packet from Washington, D.C. to New York City in a 28-minute flight. In May, 1949, he led the team representing the 4th Fighter Wing at the first Air Force Worldwide Gunnery Competition at Las Vegas Air Force Base, Nevada, winning the jet portion of the competition.

Garrison's noted gunnery skills and prior instructor experience resulted in his transfer in May 1950 to Las Vegas, now Nellis Air Force Base, where the USAF converted its flying training establishment into the USAF Aircraft Gunnery School. After completing the gunnery course, he remained at Nellis as an instructor and R&D officer of the 3596th Advanced Applied Tactics (later "Combat Crew Training") Squadron, where one of the instructors was Captain Manuel J. Fernandez. Garrison formed another unit jet air demonstration team, the "Mach Riders", with Fernandez and future ace Capt. William H. Wescott on wing.

At the outbreak of the Korean War, while many experienced fighter pilots deployed to combat, Garrison continued in his combat crew training role at Nellis. He was promoted to major in 1951 and took command of the 3596th CCTS. The commander of the 4th Fighter-Interceptor Wing (successor to the 4th FG) requested Garrison by name to join the wing, and in November 1952 Garrison went to Kimpo Air Base, Korea, as operations officer of the 335th Fighter-Interceptor Squadron.

Korean War

In January 1953, Garrison took command of the 335th FIS. The "GunVal Project", seven F-86s and five veteran pilots, was attached to the squadron to test armament modifications in combat. North American Aviation removed the six M3 .50-caliber machine guns from four late-production F-86Es and six block-one F-86Fs, expanded the size of the gun bays, strengthened the surrounding frame assemblies, and mounted four newly developed T-160 20mm cannon in their place. Having a similar rate of fire, the cannons were expected to significantly increase the Sabre's lethality over that of the machine guns, whose armor-piercing incendiary ammunition was usually ineffective against jet aircraft above 35,000 feet of altitude. However, the heavier weight and bulk of the cannons and ammunition, while providing greater effective range, flatter trajectory, and higher velocity, limited the F-86 to only 400 total rounds, which reduced its total firing time by nearly 75%, from 16 to 4.6 seconds.

Garrison worked closely with the project after one of the test aircraft was lost in combat on January 25 because its engine experienced compressor stall from ingesting the cannons' propellent gases. He regularly flew GunVal Sabres on missions before the testing ended on May 1, and despite firing limitations imposed by the stall risk, scored a MiG victory in a cannon-equipped F-86F, near Sui-ho Reservoir on March 26.

His first victory came on February 21, 1953, during his 18th mission as 335th FIS commander. Engaging a pair of MiGs in a "dogfight", Garrison was nearly shot down as he became too focused on his quarry and failed to detect a MiG closing in from behind, then became locked into a Lufbery circle. When the MiGs broke the circle and tried to escape, both he and his wingmen destroyed one. With just two MiG credits in his first six months of his tour, Garrison's tally increased dramatically in the final three months of combat before the Korean armistice. In the spring of 1953, the size of the Fifth Air Force's F-86 force doubled, increasing competitiveness among its pilots for victories over largely inexperienced communist pilots. Garrison achieved two kills in May.

On June 5, 1953, he led a fighter sweep to the mouth of the Yalu River in the northwest corner of "MiG Alley" at 45,000 feet. Observing approximately 40 MiG's in the process of taking off from an airfield in Manchuria, he led his flight of four aircraft in an attack on the vulnerable fighters, diving at Mach 1 through a protective top cover of MiGs 20,000 feet over the base. Almost immediately he shot down a MiG at low altitude, followed by a second soon after, as every member of the flight scored a kill, a rare if not unique occurrence. In addition to recognition as the USAF's 32d jet ace, Garrison was awarded the Distinguished Service Cross for the mission. He was promoted to lieutenant colonel on June 25, 1953, and scored his final MiG victory on July 19, eight days before the armistice.

Professional career
Garrison finished his tour on Korea on October 28, 1953. His next assignment was in the newly activated 4750th Training Wing (Air Defense) at Yuma (later Vincent) Air Force Base, Arizona, an Air Defense Command organization developing tactics and training pilots to fly the F-86D rocket-firing interceptor. There he worked in conjunction with wing commander Col. Glenn Eagleston and 4750th Training Squadron commander Lt. Col. James Jabara, both aces who also served in the 4th FIW in Korea.

Garrison attended the Marine Corps Amphibious Warfare Senior Officers Course (now the Marine Corps Command and Staff College) at Marine Corps Base Quantico from September 1957 to June 1958, then served a tour at Headquarters USAF in the Pentagon. Later assigned to Tyndall Air Force Base, Florida, he was promoted to colonel in March 1961. Assigned to the 25th Air Division at McChord Air Force Base, Washington, Garrison served on the command staff and as senior advisor to the Washington Air National Guard through the early 1960s.

Vietnam War and service to retirement

In August 1965, Garrison returned to combat for the third time in his career, becoming deputy commander for operations (DCO) of the 405th Fighter Wing at Clark Air Base in the Philippines. The 405th was a composite wing of F-100 Super Sabre and F-102 Delta Dagger fighters, and B-57 Canberra bombers serving temporary duty (TDY) rotations in South Vietnam. Shortly after, Garrison moved up to vice commander, and on January 5, 1966, advanced to his first wing command. He remained in command of the 405th until August 4, 1966, when he was succeeded by Col. Charles Yeager.

From Clark AB, Garrison was assigned as vice commander of the 8th Tactical Fighter Wing at Ubon Royal Thai Air Force Base, Thailand, in August 1966. The following month Col. Robin Olds was made commander of the 8th TFW to invigorate its combat spirit, and together with deputy commander of operations Col. Daniel "Chappie" James and Garrison, provided one of the strongest and most experienced command triumvirates in Southeast Asia. Garrison flew the F-4C Phantom II on 97 missions over North Vietnam and Laos, although Olds noted that Garrison never formally "checked out" (qualified) in the type, as a result of which he always flew with an instructor pilot in the rear seat. In describing Garrison's combat experience, Olds observed that Garrison flew his "52nd combat mission on his 52nd birthday" while at Ubon. Olds also noted that by 1967 Garrison was:
...so nearsighted he carried about four different pairs of glasses with him...but by God, if you wanted a target bombed, he would hit it. He would hit it when everybody else missed. ...He got furious with me because I wouldn't let him get up there among the MiGs. I told him, 'Pappy, every fighter pilot in the Air Force knows and loves you, and I am not going to be the guy that sends you up there to get your butt scragged.' He just could not see anymore.

He finished his tour on June 5, 1967, turning over his vice commander's slot to James.

Between the end of his combat tour and his retirement on March 1, 1973, Garrison served in a number of command slots: commanding officer of the F-101 Voodoo-equipped 408th Fighter Group at Kingsley Field, Oregon, from July 1967 to August 1968; vice commander of the 26th Air Division at Adair Air Force Station, Oregon, to June 1969; commander of the 4780th Air Defense Wing at Perrin Air Force Station, Texas, to July 1971; and commanding officer of the 4661st Air Base Group at Hamilton Air Force Base, California, to his retirement.

Aerial victory credits

SOURCES: Air Force Historical Study 85: USAF Credits for the Destruction of Enemy Aircraft, World War II and Air Force Historical Study 81: USAF Credits for the Destruction of Enemy Aircraft, Korean War; Oliver, The Inner Seven, p. 66.

None of Garrison's assigned aircraft was named or featured nose art. He scored all but the last of his 7.33 World War II victories in P-47 Thunderbolts 41-6573, marked VF: S, and 42-74663, marked VF: H. His final kill was also the plane in which he was shot down, P-51B 43-6871, with the VF:H markings. His Korean War MiG-15 kills were made in F-86F 51-12959, an unrecorded GunVal Project F-86F-2, and F-86F's 51-12944 and 51-12953.

Awards and decorations
Vermont Garrison's ribbons, including retroactive awards.

Distinguished Service Cross citation
Garrison, Vermont
Lieutenant Colonel, U.S. Air Force
335th Fighter-Interceptor Squadron, 4th Fighter-Interceptor Wing, 5th Air Force
Date of Action:   June 5, 1953
Headquarters, Far East Air Forces:   General Orders No. 387 (October 13, 1953)
Citation:

Notes
Footnotes

Citations

References

Glines, Carroll (1979). Saga of the Air Mail, Arno Press, 
Hatch, Gardner N. (1997). P-51 Mustang, Paducah: Turner Publishing. 
Newton, Wesley P. Jr., and Senning, Calvin F. (1985). USAF Credits for the Destruction of Enemy Aircraft, World War II (USAF Historical Study No. 85). AFHRA, Maxwell AFB.
Olds, Robin. (2010) Fighter Pilot: The Memoirs of Legendary Ace Robin Olds , St. Martin's Press, 
Oliver, William E. (1999). The Inner Seven: The History of Seven Unique American Combat Aces of World War II and Korea. Paducah, Kentucky: Turner Publishing, 

Thompson, Warren (2006). F-86 Sabre Aces of the 4th Fighter Wing, Botley, Oxford: Osprey Publishing. 
Thompson, Warren E., and McLaren, David R. (2002). MiG Alley: Sabres vs. MiGs Over Korea, North Branch, Minnesota: Specialty Press. 
Werrell, Kenneth P. (2005). Sabres over MiG Alley: The F-86 and the Battle for Air Superiority in Korea, Annapolis: Naval Institute Press.

External links
 Col Vermont "Garry" Garrison. Findagrave; World War II image of Garrison at site
 New York Times obituary: Vermont Garrison
 Veteran tributes: Vermont Garrison
 4th Fighter Group Association WWII

1915 births
1994 deaths
United States Army Air Forces pilots of World War II
United States Air Force personnel of the Korean War
United States Air Force personnel of the Vietnam War
American Korean War flying aces
American prisoners of war in World War II
American Vietnam War pilots
American World War II flying aces
Aviators from Kentucky
American Royal Air Force pilots of World War II
Royal Air Force pilots of World War II
People from Mountain Home, Idaho
People from Pulaski County, Kentucky
Recipients of the Distinguished Service Cross (United States)
Recipients of the Silver Star
Recipients of the Legion of Merit
Recipients of the Distinguished Flying Cross (United States)
Recipients of the Air Medal
United States Air Force officers
United States Air Force colonels